Mees's nightjar (Caprimulgus meesi) is a member of the nightjar family (Caprimulgidae) described as new to science in 2004.

It is a representative of the large-tailed nightjar complex found on Flores and Sumba, Indonesia. Previously unrecognised as a separate taxon due to its lack of morphological distinctness, Sangster and Rozendaal (2004) described this new species on the basis of its vocalisations, which differ significantly from those of the large-tailed nightjar races resident on other islands in the Lesser Sundas.

The species is named after Gerlof Mees, former curator of the Natural History Museum, Leiden.

References

 Sangster, G. and F. Rozendaal (2004) Territorial songs and species-level taxonomy of nightjars of the Caprimulgus macrurus complex, with the description of a new species. Zoologische Verhandelingen (Leiden) Vol. 350 pp. 7–45 PDF

Mees's nightjar
Birds of Flores
Birds of Sumba
Mees's nightjar